Mohamad Kasem (born 3 October 1993) is a Syrian judoka.

He competed at the 2016 Summer Olympics in Rio de Janeiro, in the men's 73 kg, where he was eliminated by An Chang-rim in the second round.

References

1993 births
Living people
Syrian male judoka
Olympic judoka of Syria
Judoka at the 2016 Summer Olympics
Judoka at the 2018 Asian Games
Kurash practitioners at the 2018 Asian Games
Asian Games competitors for Syria
Competitors at the 2018 Mediterranean Games